Paul Thomas Sharpe (born 12 December 1955) is a British biologist who is the Dickinson Professor of Craniofacial Biology and Director, Centre for Craniofacial and Regenerative Biology, King's College London.

Education
Sharpe was educated at De La Salle College, Sheffield (now All Saints Catholic High School, Sheffield) (1967-1974). He holds a BA in Biology from the University of York (1977) and a PhD from the University of Sheffield (1981).

Research
Following his doctoral work at the University of Sheffield, Sharpe continued as a postdoctoral researcher there and also at the University of Wisconsin and the University of Cambridge prior to his first academic appointment at the University of Manchester (1997). Sharpe's research focuses on cell differentiation and began with his doctoral work on differentiation of the cellular slime mould Dictyostelium discoideum but he extended this work to mammalian tissues, principally bone. In this early work he applied the technique of thin layer countercurrent distribution. Subsequently, through the study of mouse embryo differentiation and the role of homeobox sequences in DNA, his work has mainly been applied to the field of craniofacial development. Most recently he has been leading research into the possibility of tooth regeneration and the development of new biological-based treatments for tooth repair. Sharpe is author of Methods of Cell Separation.

Awards and recognition
Sharpe is an Honorary Fellow of the Royal College of Surgeons in Edinburgh (2010) and a recipient of the Gregor Mendel Memorial Medal (2003). He was awarded the Craniofacial Biology Research Award by the International Association for Dental Research (2004) and 2018 he received the William J Gies award for best publication is Biomaterials and Bioengineering (2018).

Personal life
Sharpe (stage name Paul Shaft) is a musician and was a pioneer of the Sheffield punk music and new wave music scene. Originally he played bass guitar in the Sheffield band 2.3 and then formed the avant-garde band De Tian. He later played double bass and sang in the experimental jazz influenced band, Bass Tone Trap. Sharpe (Shaft) reformed 2.3 in 2018 and they have released two albums. Sharpe, a lifelong supporter of Sheffield United F.C. is married to Joy Elizabeth Sharpe (nee Mitchell) and they have two children.

Bibliography
Sharpe has over 300 publications listed on Web of Science which have been cited more than 14,500 times; his h-index is 66. His three most-cited articles are:

References

External links

Entry on Web of Science
Entry on ORCID

British biologists
Living people
1955 births
Alumni of the University of Sheffield
Alumni of the University of York